This is a  list of speakers of the Alaska House of Representatives.  The speaker is the presiding officer of the Alaska House of Representatives.  This list covers both the territorial House (convened mostly biennially between 1913 and 1957) and the state House (convened annually since 1959).

Speakers

Territorial House

State House

See also
 List of Alaska state legislatures

External links
  — contains photos of most speakers

Speakers
Alaska